Antioch University New England is a private graduate school located in Keene, New Hampshire, United States. It is part of the Antioch University system, a private, non-profit, 501(c)(3) institution that includes campuses in Seattle, Washington; Los Angeles, California; and Santa Barbara, California. It is accredited by the Higher Learning Commission. The most well-known campus was Antioch College in Yellow Springs, Ohio, which is now independent of the Antioch University system.

History 
In 1964, Antioch College opened a new center on the East Coast to offer graduate education with a practical bent. The new school, called Antioch-Putney, opened its doors in Putney, Vermont.

The school moved from Putney to Harrisville, in the New Hampshire hills. It expanded, offering more graduate programs and expanding the scope of the education department. The name was then changed to Antioch New England Graduate School.

Antioch College of Ohio was the most well-known campus in the system. It was founded in 1852 by Horace Mann and known for its liberal politics, such as its 1990 policy requiring explicit verbal consent before any sexual act amongst students. Coretta Scott King and Stephen Jay Gould were graduates.

However, the Antioch system faced difficult times in the 2000s. Its board chose to close Antioch College to retrench and reduce costs. An alumni-controlled group was able to negotiate a separation between Antioch College and the adult education system of which Antioch University New England is a part. AUNE no longer is affiliated with Antioch College.

Antioch University New England, as it is currently known, is situated in a renovated furniture factory in Keene, New Hampshire, almost exactly midway between the former locations. It serves a student body of around 1,000 students, offering four certificate programs, master's degrees in twenty-three different programs, and three doctoral programs.

According to Antioch University New England, 73% of its students are female and 70% are from New England.

Mission 
Students are required to perform up to 600 hours of on-the-job experience through internships. Classes are scheduled with the working student in mind. To create the time for those internships, each department usually holds all its classes on one or two days of the week.

Academics

Applied psychology 
Antioch University New England department of Applied Psychology offers master's degrees in
 Clinical Mental Health Counseling, accredited by CACREP, prepares students to sit for examination as an LMHC/LPC, and includes an option to focus specifically on Substance Abuse Counseling. It is the only program in New England which offers graduates the ability to be dually licensed as Mental Health Counselors (LMHC/LPC) and Substance Abuse Counselors (LDAC).
 Dance/Movement Therapy and Counseling is one of only six graduate programs in the United States approved by the American Dance Therapy Association.  Likewise, students in this program have the option of taking courses which will lead them to LMHC licensure.
 Marriage & Family Therapy. Accredited by COAMFTE, graduates of the Masters program are able to practice as Licensed Marriage & Family Therapists (LMFT).

The department also offers:
 PhD in Marriage and Family Therapy 
 Certificates in Marriage and Family Therapy, Autism Spectrum Disorders and Applied Behavior Analysis

Clinical psychology 
The New England campus of Antioch University offers an APA-accredited Doctor of Psychology (PsyD) program in clinical psychology.

Education 
Antioch University New England offers master's of education degrees in elementary, early childhood, and special education teacher certification; working educators; and Waldorf teacher education, as well as a certificate in Waldorf teacher education. The Working Educator MEd program offers seven concentrations: Next Generation Learning Using Technology, Educating for Sustainability, Teacher Leadership, Problem-Based Learning Using Critical Skills, Self-Designed, Autism Spectrum Disorders, and Applied Behavior Analysis, as well as an MEd and a certificate in Principal Certification.

The university offers one of three established Waldorf teacher training programs in the United States (besides Sunbridge Institute and Rudolf Steiner College). Antioch's Waldorf training program offers optional state certification and master's degree additions to the Waldorf training. The Antioch Center for School Renewal, the service wing of the education department, provides support for teachers and schools.

Environmental studies 
AUNE offers a master's degree in environmental studies with concentrations in conservation biology, advocacy for social justice and sustainability, environmental education, science teacher certification, sustainable development and climate change, and self-designed studies. It also offers a master's degree in resource management and conservation, and a PhD in environmental studies.

Antioch University New England's Advocacy for Social Justice and Sustainability concentration was recognized by MoveOn.org's executive director, Eli Pariser, as a model program for working positively to promote and protect the environment.

The Antioch Center for Climate Preparedness and Community Resilience "delivers applied research, consulting, education and training" and partners in an Ecovation Hub program with the School for International Training, Greenfield Community College, and Keene State College.

Management 
Antioch New England offers a Master's of Business Administration (MBA) in sustainability, as well as a certificate is sustainable business.

Alumni and faculty

Notable Antioch University New England faculty 
 David Sobel is a faculty member in the Education Department. He has written about place-based education. He is the author of Beyond Ecophobia: Reclaiming the Heart in Nature Education (1996 ), Place-Based Education: Connecting Classrooms and Communities (2004 ), Mapmaking with Children: Sense-of-Place Education for the Elementary Years (1998 ), and Children's Special Places: Exploring the Role of Forts, Dens, and Bush Houses in Middle Childhood (1993 ).
 Tom Wessels (b. 1951), is faculty emeritus in Antioch's Department of Environmental Studies faculty. His books include The Myth of Progress: Toward a Sustainable Future (2006 ), Untamed Vermont (2003), The Granite Landscape: A Natural History of America’s Mountain Domes from Acadia to Yosemite (2001), Forest Forensics: A Field Guide to Reading the Forested Landscape (2010 ) and Reading the Forested Landscape: A Natural History of New England (1997 )."

Notable Antioch University New England alumni 
 Jerome Clayton Glenn (b. 1945), (MA in Teaching Social Science - Futuristics) is the co-founder and Director of The Millennium Project and former executive director of the American Council for the United Nations University.
 David Sobel (M.Ed) is currently a core faculty member at Antioch (see above).
Chad Allen (actor)

References

 Antioch University New England. "About ANE: ANE History." (2006). World Wide Web. Retrieved October 24, 2006, Link
 Antioch University New England. "About ANE: ANE Students." (2006). World Wide Web. Retrieved October 24, 2006, Link
 Antioch University New England. "About ANE: Mission and Values." (2006). World Wide Web. Retrieved October 24, 2006, Link
 Antioch University New England. "Antioch New England" (2006). World Wide Web. Retrieved October 24, 2006, Link
 Antioch Center for School Renewal. "Antioch New England: Antioch Center for School Renewal" (2006). World Wide Web. Retrieved October 24, 2006, Link
 Antioch New England Institute. "Building Stronger Communities and Schools" (2006). World Wide Web. Retrieved October 24, 2006, Link
 Antioch University New England. "Antioch New England: News & Event Details" (2006). World Wide Web. Retrieved October 25, 2006, Link
 Grad Profiles. "Antioch New England." Retrieved June 11, 2007, Link
 MediaMente. "Jerome Clayton Glenn." Retrieved June 11, 2007, Link
 Watts, Heidi. (2000) Antioch in New England: The First Eight Years, Antioch New England Graduate School.

External links

 Antioch University New England official website
 Gradschools.com profile of Antioch University New England
 Antioch University overview

Private universities and colleges in New Hampshire
New England
Educational institutions established in 1964
Universities and colleges in Cheshire County, New Hampshire
1964 establishments in New Hampshire
Buildings and structures in Keene, New Hampshire